Patricia O'Toole is an American historian who taught at Columbia University. She is a Society of American Historians fellow and was a visitor at the Institute for Advanced Study.

Works

References

External links 

Living people
American women historians
Columbia University faculty
20th-century American historians
20th-century American women writers
21st-century American historians
21st-century American women writers
Year of birth missing (living people)